This is a list of Russian football transfers in the winter transfer window 2014–15 by club. Only clubs of the 2014–15 Russian Premier League are included.

Russian Premier League 2014-15

Amkar Perm

In:

Out:

Arsenal Tula

In:

Out:

CSKA Moscow

In:

Out:

Dynamo Moscow

In:

Out:

Krasnodar

In:

Out:

Kuban Krasnodar

In:

Out:

Lokomotiv Moscow

In:

Out:

Mordovia Saransk

In:

Out:

Rostov

In:

Out:

Rubin Kazan

In:

Out:

Spartak Moscow

In:

Out:

Terek Grozny

In:

Out:

Torpedo Moscow

In:

Out:

Ufa

In:

Out:

Ural Sverdlovsk Oblast

In:

Out:

Zenit Saint Petersburg

In:

Out:

References

Transfers
2014-15
Russia